Fantome was a 679-ton staysail schooner owned by Windjammer Barefoot Cruises in Miami, Florida.  Completed in 1927 by the Duke of Westminster, she was purchased by Windjammer in 1969, and became flagship of the fleet.  During her twenty-nine years of service in this regard, Fantome offered cruises in the Caribbean and the Bay of Honduras.  She was lost in October 1998 during Hurricane Mitch.

Early years

Originally ordered for the Italian navy but was purchased before completion by the Duke of Westminster, who finished her as a yacht (launched in 1927). Westminster used her only a few years before she changed hands twice in short order. It is often said that she was acquired by the Irishman Ernest Guinness, a senior member of the Guinness family, but he owned the Fantome II, now named the Belem.

She was in the Pacific in the late 1930s and when war broke out in Europe in 1939, she was in Alaskan waters. Reluctant to cruise further or return to Ireland, he elected to lay her up in Seattle for the duration of hostilities.  At the end of the war she was stranded in Portage Bay for 14 years, barred by King County from sailing pending the payment of back taxes.

Windjammer

In 1969, Windjammer owner and founder Michael Burke flew to Greece to purchase the schooner directly from Aristotle Onassis. He bought her, sight unseen, in exchange for a freighter. Windjammer then set about refurbishing Fantome, which became the flagship of their fleet of six vessels.

Loss

On 24 October 1998, Fantome departed the harbor of Omoa, Honduras for a planned six-day cruise. Captain Guyan March decided to play it safe by heading for the Bay Islands and wait for the storm to pass.

By dawn on the following day, however, Mitch seemed to change course. Fantome immediately changed course for Belize City, where she disembarked all of her passengers and non-essential crew members. The schooner then departed Belize City, first heading north towards the Gulf of Mexico, in order to outrun the storm. Storm predictions proved extremely difficult, as the steering currents in Hurricane Mitch were very weak. When word reached Fantome that Mitch would most likely hit the Yucatán before she could get out of harm's way, March changed course for the south. It was too early to know that he was heading directly into the storm's path.

The plan was to make for the lee side of the island of Roatan. In case Mitch made landfall in the Yucatán or Belize, by being on the southern side of the island, it would provide her with enough protection to hopefully keep it from getting damaged by large swells and high winds. However Mitch, now a Category 5 hurricane with winds up to 180 mph (285 km/h), took a jog towards the south, directly towards Roatan.

As Mitch moved in on Roatan and Honduras, Fantome made one desperate attempt to flee to safety, now heading east towards the Caribbean. Mitch's forward motion picked up, though, and Fantome was unable to outrun the storm. Around 4:30 p.m. on 27 October 1998, with Mitch having weakened but still at Category 5 intensity, Fantome reported that she was fighting  winds in  seas. Radio contact was lost with Fantome shortly after that.

On 2 November, a helicopter dispatched by the British destroyer  discovered life rafts and vests labeled "S/V Fantome" off the eastern coast of Guanaja. It was all that was found of Fantome. All 31 crew members aboard perished and a memorial service was held for them on December 12, 1998.

See also
Belem (ship)

References

Fantome
Fantome
Shipwrecks in the Caribbean Sea